Aechmea geminiflora is a species of plant in the family Bromeliaceae. It is endemic to Tungurahua Province in Ecuador.  Its natural habitat is subtropical or tropical moist montane forests. It is threatened by habitat loss.

References

Flora of Ecuador
geminiflora
Plants described in 1935
Data deficient plants
Taxonomy articles created by Polbot